Aerotranscargo  is a cargo airline based in Chișinău International Airport, Moldova.

History
Established in 2012, it operates chartered cargo flights using a fleet of Boeing 747-400F freighters. In 2020, Aerotranscargo added two more 747-400F aircraft, expanding its fleet to six. In 2021, a seventh 747-400F was purchased from Thai Airways.

On 24 February 2021, it was reported that Aerotranscargo was to set up a subsidiary in the Netherlands, operating from Amsterdam Airport Schiphol with flights to China, Hong Kong and the United States. Branded as Aerotranscargo NL, the subsidiary was to initially lease 2 Boeing 747 freighters from the parent company, but aimed to add Boeing 747-8F and 777F aircraft in the long run, with a fleet of up to 10 aircraft. Aerotranscargo NL was due to start flying in the summer of 2021. However, in May 2021, plans to begin flights for Aerotranscargo NL were aborted, with the new subsidiary ceasing all operations.

Fleet

Aerotranscargo exclusively operates 747-400Fs.

References 

Airlines of Moldova
Airlines established in 2012
Cargo airlines